The Andalucía Costa del Sol Match Play 9 is a golf tournament on the Challenge Tour, played in Spain. It is a mixed stroke-play and match-play event, broadly similar to the World Super 6 Perth, the main difference being that the match-play matches are over 9 holes rather than 6. Aaron Rai won the inaugural tournament, beating Gavin Moynihan in the final. The inaugural event was held at La Cala Resort before moving to Valle Romano Golf in 2018 and 2019.

Format
The event starts with 36 hole of stroke play over two days. In 2017 the leading 32 players qualify for the match play stage. There is a sudden-death playoff for those tying for 32nd place. Seedings are based on a countback system, so that where players are equal, those having the better second round are seeded higher. There are then five match play rounds, two on the third day and three on the final day, all matches being over 9 holes with a sudden-death playoff if required. There are a number of other matches for the minor places. In 2018 the number of qualifiers for the match play stage was increased to 64 with three rounds on both the third and final days.

Winners

References

External links
Coverage on La Cala Resort site
Coverage on the Challenge Tour's site

Former Challenge Tour events
Golf tournaments in Spain